Gabriel O'Kara Northern (born June 8, 1974) is a former American football linebacker and defensive end who played for five seasons with the Buffalo Bills and Minnesota Vikings. He served as defensive line coach at Prairie View A&M from 2011 to 2012 and 2014, and in the same position at Grambling State from 2001 to 2003.

As a rookie in 1996, he finished the year with 5.0 Sacks and 19 Tackles.  In his second season, he started one game and recorded 24 tackles. He made the switch to outside linebacker in 1998 and started 16 games, finishing with 2.0 Sacks, one interception, one forced fumble, and 32 Tackles.  In 1999, he again started 16 games and finished with 3.5 sacks, two forced fumbles, one fumble recovery, and 35 Tackles.

References

1974 births
Living people
Players of American football from Baton Rouge, Louisiana
American football defensive ends
American football linebackers
LSU Tigers football players
Buffalo Bills players
Minnesota Vikings players
Prairie View A&M Panthers football coaches
Grambling State Tigers football coaches